Manuel Garrido (born 1964) is an Argentine politician, who served as a member of the Chamber of Deputies for the City of Buenos Aires. He belongs to the Radical Civic Union (UCR).

References

External links
 Official site 

Radical Civic Union politicians
People from Buenos Aires
Living people
1964 births
Members of the Argentine Chamber of Deputies elected in Buenos Aires